The 2003 Swiss Figure Skating Championships (officially named  and ) were held in Zug from December 20 through 21st, 2002. Medals were awarded in the disciplines of men's singles, ladies' singles, pair skating, and ice dancing.

Senior results

Men

Ladies

Junior results

Men

Ladies

Pairs

Ice dancing

External links
 The 2003 Swiss Figure Skating Championships

Swiss Figure Skating Championships
2002 in figure skating
Swiss Figure Skating Championships, 2003